DZCL (93.1 FM), broadcasting as Sky Radio 93.1, is a radio station owned and operated by Kaissar Broadcasting Network. Its studios and transmitter are located along San Jose St., Zone 1, Brgy. Dunao, Ligao.

References

Radio stations established in 2005
Radio stations in Albay